Johann "Jack" Unterweger (16 August 1950  – 29 June 1994) was an Austrian serial killer who committed murder in several countries – Austria, West Germany, Czechoslovakia, and the United States. Initially convicted in 1974 of a single murder, Unterweger began to write extensively while in prison. His work gained the attention of the Austrian literary elite, who took it as evidence that he had been rehabilitated.

After significant lobbying, Unterweger was released on parole in 1990. Upon his release, he became a minor celebrity and worked as a playwright and journalist, but within months he resumed killing women. Unterweger hanged himself in prison after being convicted of nine more murders in June 1994.

Early life 
Jack Unterweger was born August 16, 1950, in Judenburg, Styria, Austria, to Theresia Unterweger, a Viennese barmaid and waitress, and Jack Becker, an American soldier whom she had met in Trieste, Italy. Some sources describe his mother as a sex worker. Unterweger's mother was jailed for fraud while pregnant but was released and travelled to Graz, where he was born. After his mother was arrested again in 1953, Unterweger was sent to Carinthia to live with his grandfather, who was known as a "rough fellow" who regularly used his grandson to help him steal farm animals.

Unterweger was in and out of prison for much of his youth. He worked as a waiter but between 1966 and 1974 he was convicted sixteen times, mostly for theft-related offences, but also for pimping and sexual assault on a sex worker; he spent most of those eight years in jail.

First murder conviction, imprisonment and release
In 1974, Unterweger murdered 18-year-old West German national Margaret Schäfer by strangling her with her own bra, for which he was convicted and sentenced to life in prison in 1976. While incarcerated he wrote short stories, poems, plays, and an autobiography, Purgatory or The Trip to Prison – Report of a Guilty Man, that later served as the basis for a documentary. Several figures, including Austrian writer Elfriede Jelinek, have since questioned whether Unterweger actually wrote Purgatory. 

In 1985, a campaign to pardon and release Unterweger from prison commenced. Austrian President Rudolf Kirchschläger (SPÖ/ÖVP) refused the petition when presented to him, citing the court-mandated minimum of fifteen years in prison. Writers, artists, journalists and politicians agitated for a pardon, including Jelinek and German novelist Günter Grass; along with the editor of the magazine Manuskripte, Alfred Kolleritsch.

Unterweger was released on 23 May 1990, after the required minimum fifteen years of his life term. Upon his release, Purgatory was taught in Austrian schools and his stories for children were performed on Austrian radio. Unterweger himself hosted television programmes which discussed criminal rehabilitation and worked as a journalist for the public broadcaster ORF, where he reported on stories concerning the very murders for which he was later found guilty.

Later murders 
Law enforcement later discovered that Unterweger killed a young woman named Blanka Bočková in Czechoslovakia, and seven more in Austria in 1990—Brunhilde Masser, aged 39; Heidi Hammerer, aged 31; Elfriede Schrempf, aged 35; Silvia Zagler, aged 23; Sabine Moitzl, aged 25; Karin Eroglu-Sladky, aged 25; Regina Prem, aged 32, all in the first year after his release, and all garroted with their bras.

In 1991, Unterweger was hired by an Austrian magazine to write about crime in Los Angeles and the differences between U.S. and European attitudes to prostitution. He met local police, even going so far as to participate in a ride-along of the city's red light districts. During Unterweger's time in Los Angeles, three sex workers: Shannon Exley, Irene Rodriguez, and Peggy Booth, were beaten, sexually assaulted with tree branches, and strangled with their own bras.

Back in Austria, Unterweger was suggested as a suspect for the sex worker murders. In the absence of other suspects, police took a serious look at Unterweger and kept him under surveillance until he went to the US, ostensibly as a reporter; the police observed nothing to connect him with the killings.

Arrest and death 
Police in Graz eventually gathered enough evidence to arrest Unterweger, but he had fled by the time they entered his home. After law enforcement agencies chased him and his girlfriend, Bianca Mrak, through Switzerland, France, and the US, he was finally arrested by US Marshals in Miami, Florida, on 27 February 1992. While a fugitive, he had called the Austrian media to try to convince them of his innocence.

Unterweger was extradited back to Austria on 27 May 1992 and charged with eleven murders, including one in Prague and three in Los Angeles. The jury found him guilty of nine murders by a 6:2 majority, sufficient for a conviction under Austrian law at the time. Based on psychiatric examination, Austrian psychiatrist Dr. Reinhard Haller diagnosed Unterweger with narcissistic personality disorder and presented his findings to the court on 20 June 1994. On 29 June, Unterweger was sentenced to life in prison without possibility of parole.

That night, Unterweger committed suicide at Graz-Karlau Prison by hanging himself with a rope made from shoelaces and a cord from the trousers of a track suit, using the same knot that was found on all the strangled sex workers.

Prior to his death, Unterweger had asserted his intention to seek an appeal, and therefore, under Austrian law, his guilty verdict was not considered legally binding after his death, as it has not been reviewed and confirmed by the court.

See also 
 Jack Abbott (author)
 List of serial killers by country
 List of serial killers by number of victims

References 

1950 births
1994 suicides
20th-century criminals
20th-century Austrian dramatists and playwrights
20th-century Austrian male writers
Austrian autobiographers
Austrian male dramatists and playwrights
Austrian people convicted of murder
Austrian people of American descent
Austrian people who died in prison custody
Austrian prisoners sentenced to life imprisonment
Austrian rapists
Austrian serial killers
Crimes against sex workers
Criminals from Los Angeles
Male serial killers
People convicted of murder by Austria
People from Judenburg
People with narcissistic personality disorder
Prisoners sentenced to life imprisonment by Austria
Prisoners who died in Austrian detention
Serial killers who committed suicide in prison custody
Suicides by hanging in Austria
Violence against women in Europe
Violence against women in the United States